Inhabited is an American contemporary Christian/rock band from Spring, Texas formed in 2003. By both their sound of music and their Christian lyrics, critics have often compared their sound to bands such as Superchic[k], Rebecca St. James, and others.

History
The band's third studio album, Love, was originally titled The Life Unfolding circa late 2006. In April 2007, they issued a pre-release of the album with the new name. Since then, 4 of the original 13 songs were removed and another was added. The band's official website used to have a pop-up download of a track entitled "Listen Up" with the old album name in the ID tag. In the Love track lineup, this track has been renamed "Are You With Me".

Members 
 Sara Delight Acker – lead vocals
 Marcus Acker – lead guitar, backing vocals
 Charlie Harper – drums
 Justin Bassett – bass guitar

Discography

Albums 

2003: Innerview – independently released
2005: The Revolution – Fervent Records
2008: Love – 7Spin Music
2010: Inhabited Unplugged - Acoustic album
2010: Love 2 - Unreleased songs for the album Love

Games 

 "Rescue Me" was featured on Guitar Praise. :Open My Eyes" was added to the Rock Band library on 12/28/10.

References

Christian rock groups from Texas
Fervent Records artists
Musical groups established in 2003
People from Spring, Texas